The Jusuf Efendi Mosque  was built in 1773 at a time when North Macedonia was a part of the Ottoman Empire. It was damaged in the 1963 earthquake  and reconstructed in 1967.

See also
Macedonian Muslims
Muftiship of Kumanovo
Islam in North Macedonia
Islamic Religious Community of Macedonia

References

External links
Gallery of mosques in Kumanovo area including Jusuf Efendi Mosque

Ottoman mosques in North Macedonia
Lipkovo Municipality